Bidit Lal Das (commonly known as Potol Babu; 15 June 1938 – 8 October 2012) was a Bangladeshi folk singer and composer. He composed notable Bengali folk songs including "Shadher Lau Banailo Morey Boiragi", "Kare Dekhabo Moner Dukkho Go Ami Buk Chiria", "Sylhet Prothom Ajan Dhoni Babai Diachhey", "Pran Kande More Mon Kande Ray" and "Moriley Kandishna Amar Dai". He was an artiste of Swadhin Bangla Betar Kendra.

Early life and career
Das was born in Sylhet's Sheikhghat area on 15 June 1938. He studied English literature in Shillong, India. He was taught music by Ustad Pranesh Das, and later by Ustad Paresh Chakravarty.

In 2004, Das established Nilom Sangitaloy, a music school. He was the president of Bangladesh Sangeet Sangathan Samannay Parishad's Sylhet chapter. He founded an organization called "Bidit Lal Das O Shohoshilpibrindo".

Awards
 Gunijon Award by Bangladesh Shilpakala Academy
 Bharotiyo Loka Sangbordhona
 Sylhet Lokasangeet Parishad Award 
 Nazrul Academy Award

References

1938 births
2012 deaths
People from Sylhet
20th-century Bangladeshi male singers
20th-century Bangladeshi singers
Bangladeshi folk singers